Great Britain and Ireland may refer to:

The United Kingdom of Great Britain and Ireland, the sovereign state created in 1801, combining the former Kingdom of Great Britain with Ireland, separated by the Anglo-Irish Treaty of 1921
 Great Britain and Ireland, the two largest islands in the British Isles
 The present-day United Kingdom and the Republic of Ireland, two sovereign states
 Ireland–United Kingdom relations, the relations between the Republic of Ireland and the United Kingdom

See also
 Terminology of the British Isles